Rachel Moore may refer to:

Rachel Moore (writer) (born 1932), pseudonym used by Jean Saunders
Rachel Moore (arts administrator), Los Angeles administrator and CEO
Rachel Anne Moore, American theatre actress and opera singer
Rachel Moore (Case Closed), character of the anime and manga Case Closed, known in Japan as Detective Conan
Rachel Dolezal (born 1977), previously known as Rachel Moore, former college instructor and former NNAACP chapter president